Motor City is a nickname for Detroit, Michigan, United States.

Motor City may also refer to:
Oshawa, Ontario

Geography
Motor City, California
Dubai Motor City

Arts, entertainment, media and music 
Motor City Online, an online game released by Electronic Arts
Motor City Patrol, a line of video games published by Matchbox
Motorcity, an animated TV series on Disney XD
"Motor City (I Get Lost)", a song by Australian group Company of Strangers
MC5, one of the most iconic rock band from Detroit. The name is a short for "Motor City Five" based on their Detroit roots

Business
MotorCity Casino, a casino in Detroit

Sports
The Motor City Machine Guns, a professional wrestling tag team